The 58th New York Film Festival took place from September 17 to October 11, 2020. Due to the COVID-19 pandemic, it was staged through outdoor and online screenings.

Main slate

Currents

Spotlight

Revivals

Short films

References 

New York Film Festival
New York
New York Film Festival